The Bet is a 2016 American comedy film directed by Ryan Ederer and written by Chris Jay and Aaron Goldberg. The film features appearances from several professional wrestlers and is also the final film of Roddy Piper.

Plot 
A loser in life and love, Denton Baker gets into a high stakes bet where he has one summer to find, and hook up with, every girl he had a crush on from 1st to 12th grade. If he succeeds, he can win back the company that his father, Mr. Baker had stolen from him by a former friend, Mr. Lucas. With the help of his well meaning but overzealous best friends, Jackson Price, Ed McDoogle and Wiggins, Denton sets out to win the bet, which becomes even more difficult when he falls in love with his 2nd grade crush, Amanda Morrison.

Cast 

Alex Klein as Denton Baker
Amanda Clayton as Amanda Morrison
Brian Allen as Jackson Price
Michael Consiglio as Brandon Lucas
Yassir Lester as Ed McDoogle
Jeremiah Watkins as Wiggins
Paul Natonek as Serj
Stacy Kaney as Denise Davids
Dallas Page as Mr. Baker
Jake Roberts as Mr. Lucas
Nikki Leigh as Kendra McNulty
Gerry Bednob as Bob
Roddy Piper as Mr. Jablonski
Chris Jay as Scott Quaker
Dave England as Coffee Shop Employee
Tricia Pettitt as Woman Drinking Coffee
Maureen Shea as Carli Lombardo
Amanda Cerny as Mrs. McDoogle
Mindy Robinson as Mrs. Lucas
Chuck D as Charles McD
Katie Hilliard as Hayley Matthews
Erin Marie Hogan as Kaylee Listwan
Dian Bachar as Angry Video Store Customer
Meredith Barnett as Danielle
Julia Cho as Emily Michaels 
Tommy Dreamer as The Umpire
Larry Longstreth as Delivery Man
Ali Rose as Sarah Dawn Samuels

Production 
The Bet was written by Chris Jay and Aaron Goldberg, members of the rock band Army of Freshmen. The script was inspired by their own experience in searching out and meeting girls on whom they once had crushes in school. They enlisted Reza Riazi, who had worked on one of the band's previous videos, to produce the film. A lifelong wrestling fan, Jay personally sought out and met with Roddy Piper, whose involvement ultimately led to Dallas Page and Jake Roberts joining the film. The rest of the cast was rounded out by actors and comedians, many of whom were personal friends of the filmmakers.

The Bet was filmed entirely in the city of Ventura, California over 13 days in January and February 2014. Many of the locations used have direct connections to Jay and Goldberg, including both of their actual homes, the office where Jay worked, the video store where both Jay and Goldberg had once worked, and the city park where their softball team played.

Music 
The Bet features several original comedy songs written by Jay and Goldberg, as well as songs from a diverse group of artists including Matt Pryor of The Get Up Kids, Victor Krummenacher of Camper Van Beethoven, Zebrahead, Punchline, Jonny Polonsky, The K.G.B., Kyle, AMFX, Phil Cody and Army of Freshmen. The soundtrack was released digitally on iTunes and Spotify.

Release 
After completion of post-production The Bet received offers from multiple independent film distribution companies, ultimately signing with Screen Media Films in March 2016. The film's first trailer was released on May 3, 2016, and the film was released on July 26, 2016 on all digital VOD platforms.

References

External links 
 
 

2016 films
American comedy films
2016 comedy films
Films shot in California
2010s English-language films
2010s American films